is the debut single by Japanese singer Yōko Oginome. Written by Hiromi Kanda and Yukiyoshi Shimazu, the single was released on April 3, 1984 by Victor Entertainment.

Background and release
After being in the children's music trio Milk from 1979 to 1980 and working as an anime voice actress during the early 1980s, Oginome decided to pursue a solo music career in 1984 with "Mirai Kōkai (Sailing)". She first promoted the single with the fan event  in Kurihama, Yokosuka.

The music video features Oginome singing and dancing in a futuristic room decorated with arcade game cabinets. In the beginning of the video, the screen on the background displays her biodata.

"Mirai Kōkai (Sailing)" peaked at No. 32 on Oricon's singles chart and sold over 70,000 copies. It won the Outstanding Rookie Emerald Award at the 3rd Megalopolis Song Festival.

Oginome re-recorded the song with a synth-pop arrangement for her 1987 greatest hits album Pop Groover: The Best.

Track listing

Charts

References

External links

1984 debut singles
Yōko Oginome songs
Japanese-language songs
Victor Entertainment singles